Telphusa melanozona is a moth of the family Gelechiidae. It is found in India (Bengal).

The wingspan is 9–10 mm. The forewings are ochreous-whitish irrorated with light grey and with the base of the costa blackish. There is a moderately broad straight black transverse fascia at one-fourth and a minute black dot in the middle of the disc, as well as two black dots transversely placed in the disc at two-thirds, surrounded with whitish-ochreous, the upper forming the apex of a triangular blackish costal spot. The hindwings are light grey.

The larvae feed on Euphorbia neriifolia. They mine the leaves of their host plant.

References

Moths described in 1913
Telphusa
Taxa named by Edward Meyrick